Lake McArthur is a lake in Yoho National Park, British Columbia, Canada, near the continental divide.

Location

Lake McArthur (JANHI) is in the Kootenay Land District of British Columbia.
It is nestled in a valley between Mount Schaffer and Park Mountain in  Yoho National Park.
It is easily the deepest lake in the park, and its depth gives it a deep blue colour.
It is the largest lake in the area and is much photographed.
A 1906 guide to resorts in the Canadian Rockies describes Lake O'Hara, in the next valley west of Lake Louise and across the Continental Divide. It goes on, "A couple of miles away is McArthur's Lake, a sapphire gem, located above the tree line, and with a huge glacier, fed on the precipitous heights of Mount Biddle, terminating in the water, where it breaks off in huge icebergs.

Name

Lake McArthur is named after James Joseph McArthur (1856–1925) of the Dominion Topographical Survey.
He was the first European to describe this lake and Lake O'Hara.
He found the two lakes in 1887.
McArthur was mapping the land through which the Canadian Pacific Railway line would travel, and he and his assistant T. Riley had to climb up to summits carrying heavy equipment so McArthur could take photographs and make measurements for his survey.

Access

Lake McArthur may be accessed via an  circuit hike from Le Relais Day Shelter in Yoho Park.
The shelter is reached via an  access road.
The Lake O'Hara bus goes past the shelter, but reservations are required.
There is a  elevation gain.
The trail passes through larch forests, past Schäffer Lake, through McArthur Meadows and over the summit of McArthur Pass.

Notes

Sources

Lakes of British Columbia
Kootenay Land District